Chris Ramsay is a Canadian magician and YouTuber and television producer, known for creating and starring in the TruTV stunt magic show Big Trick Energy. His YouTube channel, featuring puzzle solves, cardistry and magic has over 6 million subscribers. His rise in popularity through social media inspired Ian Frisch to write 2019's Magic Is Dead: My Journey into the World's Most Secretive Society of Magicians, of which Ramsay is one of the subjects. In May 2020, he was heavily featured in an article by The New Yorker which showed one of his puzzle-solving videos and included him among various diversions that "offer the rare sensation of absolute focus and the joy of accomplishment".

In December 2020, he did an interview with Ben Kaplan, editor-in-chief of Kind Magazine.

He appeared in the 2021 film Spiral in the role of Speez, and some of his scenes were shown in 21 Savage's music video for his song Spiral. 

Ramsay is from Saint-Sauveur, Quebec.

References

External links

Canadian television producers
Canadian magicians
Living people
Canadian YouTubers
People from Laurentides
YouTube critics and reviewers
Year of birth missing (living people)
YouTube channels launched in 2011